Rolf Järmann (born 31 January 1966 in Arbon) is a retired road bicycle racer from Switzerland, who was a professional rider from 1988 to 1999. He twice won the Amstel Gold Race (1993 and 1998) during his career. He was the Swiss National Road Race champion in 1990. He won the Tour de Pologne in 1997. He won a stage in the 1989 Giro d'Italia, the 1992 Tour de France and also won the 1998 Tirreno-Adriatico.

According to a Cyclingnews.com report, in his book Doping, Spitzensport als gesellschaftliches Problem (Doping, Top Sport as a Social Problem), Järmann admits to using EPO.

Teams
1988: Cyndarella-Isotonic (Switzerland)
1989: Frank-Toyo-Magniflex (Switzerland)
1990: Pneuhaus Frank-Toyo (Switzerland)
1991: Weinmann-Eddy Merckx (Switzerland)
1992: Ceramiche Ariostea (Italy)
1993: Ceramiche Ariostea (Italy)
1994: GB-MG Maglificio (Italy)
1995: MG Maglificio-Technogym (Italy)
1996: MG Maglificio-Technogym (Italy)
1997: Casino-C'est votre equipe (France)
1998: Casino-C'est votre equipe (France)
1999: Post Swiss Team (Switzerland)

Tour de France
1991 – 83rd place
1992 – 62nd place (most combative rider on 3 stages, winner 12th stage)
1993 – 54th place
1994 – 73rd place
1995 – 67th place
1996 – 90th place

Major results

1988
Stausee-Rundfahrt Klingnau
1989
Giro d'Italia:
Winner stage 4
1990
 1st  Road race, National Road Championships
1992
Tour de France:
Winner stage 12
1993
Amstel Gold Race
1995
GP Ouest-France
Tour de Luxembourg
1997
Tour de Pologne
1998
 1st  Overall Tirreno–Adriatico
Amstel Gold Race

References

External links 

Official Tour de France results for Rolf Järmann

1966 births
Living people
People from Arbon
Swiss male cyclists
Cyclists at the 1996 Summer Olympics
Olympic cyclists of Switzerland
Swiss Tour de France stage winners
Swiss Giro d'Italia stage winners
Doping cases in cycling
Tour de Suisse stage winners
Sportspeople from Thurgau
20th-century Swiss people
21st-century Swiss people